Mutabbaq Samak (also mutabbak, or im'tabbag simach (Arabic  مطبق سمك)) a rice-based dish popular in the Arab states of the Persian Gulf and in some southern cities in Iraq. It is basically spiced fried fish, usually Stromateus and caramelized onions served over rice that is cooked in well-spiced fish stock. Fish can be whole fish or fish filet. It is considered a national dish in Iraq and Kuwait where the dish is pronounced in both of their colloquial dialects as "im'tabbag simach". In Arabia, raisins, cardamom and tomato broth are added too.

History 
The word "mutabbaq"  (Arabic: مطبق) in Arabic means "layered" while "samak" (Arabic: سمك) in Arabic means "fish". This is indicative of the way this dish was prepared historically, in which layers of fish, rice and bread were added in a pot which is flipped upside down when ready to be served. Today, the recipe became so much simpler that it is uncommon to find any fried fish over rice is called Mutabbaq Samak. Sometimes the fried fish with fish stock is added in a rice cooker. Mutabbaq Samak is sometimes garnished with nuts and chopped parsley and served with Arab salad. It is often considered comfort food.

See also 

Murtabaq, a closely named dish which is less known in the Arab states of the Persian Gulf 
Arab cuisine
 Mesopotamian cuisine
 Kuwaiti cuisine
 Saudi Arabian cuisine
 List of casserole dishes
 List of rice dishes

Citations 

Middle Eastern cuisine
Arab cuisine
Iraqi cuisine
Kuwaiti cuisine
Saudi Arabian cuisine
National dishes
Rice dishes